The Grande Médaille d’Or des Explorations et Voyages de Découverte (Great Gold Medal of Exploration and Journeys of Discovery) has been awarded since 1829 by the Société de Géographie of France for journeys whose outcomes have enhanced geographical knowledge.

Recipients

See also

 List of geography awards

References

Geography awards
French awards